Evgheni Nedealco, also known as Yevgeny Nedealco, is a Moldovan freestyle wrestler.

He was a quarterfinalist at the 2015 European Games.

At the 2016 World Wrestling Olympic Qualification Tournament 1 he won a bronze medal and a wrestle-off to secure a spot at the 2016 Olympics.

References

External links
 

Living people
Moldovan male sport wrestlers
European Games competitors for Moldova
Wrestlers at the 2015 European Games
Year of birth missing (living people)
Olympic wrestlers of Moldova
Wrestlers at the 2016 Summer Olympics
21st-century Moldovan people